In lunar astronomy, libration is the wagging or wavering of the Moon perceived by Earth-bound observers and caused by changes in their perspective. It permits an observer to see slightly different hemispheres of the surface at different times. It is similar in both cause and effect to the changes in the Moon's apparent size due to changes in distance. It is caused by three mechanisms detailed below, two of which cause a relatively tiny physical libration via tidal forces exerted by the Earth. Such true librations are known as well for other moons with locked rotation.

The quite different phenomenon of a trojan asteroid's movement has been called Trojan libration; and Trojan libration point means Lagrangian point.

Lunar libration
The Moon keeps one hemisphere of itself facing the Earth, due to tidal locking. Therefore, the first view of the far side of the Moon was not possible until the Soviet probe Luna 3 reached the Moon on October 7, 1959, and further lunar exploration by the United States and the Soviet Union. This simple picture is only approximately true: over time, slightly more than half (about 59% in total) of the Moon's surface is seen from Earth due to libration.

Lunar libration arises from three changes in perspective due to: the non-circular and inclined orbit, the finite size of the Earth, and the orientation of the Moon in space. The first of these is called optical libration, the second is called parallax, and the third is physical libration. Each of these can be divided into two contributions.  

The following are the four types of lunar libration:
 Optical libration, the combined libration of longitudal and latitudal libration produces a movement of the sub-Earth point and a wobbling view between the temporarily visible parts of the Moon, during a lunar orbit. This is not to be confused with the change of the Moon's apparent size due to the changing distance between the Moon and the Earth during the Moon's elliptic orbit, or with the change of positional angle due to the change the position of the Moon's tilted axis, nor the observed swinging motion of the Moon due to the relative position of the Earth's tilted axis during an orbit of the Moon.
 Libration in longitude results from the eccentricity of the Moon's orbit around Earth; the Moon's rotation sometimes leads and sometimes lags its orbital position. The lunar libration in longitude was discovered by Johannes Hevelius in 1648. It can reach 7°54′ in amplitude. Longitudal libration allows an observer on Earth to view at times further into the Moon's west and east respectively at different phases of the Moon's orbit.
 Libration in latitude results from a slight inclination (about 6.7°) between the Moon's axis of rotation and the normal to the plane of its orbit around Earth. Its origin is analogous to how the seasons arise from Earth's revolution about the Sun. Galileo Galilei is sometimes credited with the discovery of the lunar libration in latitude in 1632, although Thomas Harriot or William Gilbert might have done so before. Note Cassini's laws. It can reach 6°50′ in amplitude.  The 6.7º depends on the orbit inclination of 5.15º and the negative equatorial tilt of 1.54º. Latitudal libration allows an observer on Earth to view beyond the Moon's north pole and south pole at different phases of the Moon's orbit.
 Parallax libration depends on both the longitude and latitude of the location on Earth from where the Moon is observed.
 Diurnal libration is the small daily libration, an oscillation due to Earth's rotation, which carries an observer first to one side and then to the other side of the straight line joining Earth's and the Moon's centers, allowing the observer to look first around one side of the Moon and then around the other—since the observer is on Earth's surface, not at its center. It reaches less than 1° in amplitude.
Physical libration is the oscillation of orientation in space about uniform rotation and precession. There are physical librations about all 3 axes. The sizes are roughly 100 seconds of arc. As seen from the Earth, this amounts to less than 1 second of arc. Forced physical librations can be predicted given the orbit and shape of the Moon. The periods of free physical librations can also be predicted, but their amplitudes and phases cannot be predicted.

Physical libration 
Also called real libration, as opposed to the optical libration of longitudal, latitudal and diurnal types, the orientation of the Moon exhibits small oscillations of the pole direction in space and rotation about the pole.

This libration can be differentiated between forced and free libration, while forced is the libration due to the forces exerted in the course of the orbit of the Moon around the Earth and the Sun. Free liberation is an oscillation of longer time periods.

Forced physical libration 

Cassini’s laws state that:

 The Moon rotates uniformly about its polar axis keeping one side toward the Earth.
 The Moon’s equator plane is tilted with respect to the ecliptic plane and it precesses uniformly along the ecliptic plane. 
 The descending node of the equator on the ecliptic matches the ascending node of the orbit plane.

In addition to uniform rotation and uniform precession of the equator plane, the Moon has small oscillations of orientation in space about all 3 axes. These oscillations are called physical librations. Apart from the 1.5427º tilt between equator and ecliptic, the oscillations are approximately ±100 seconds of arc in size. These oscillations can be expressed with trigonometric series that depend on the lunar moments of inertia A < B < C. The sensitive combinations are β = (C – A)/B and γ = (B – A)/C. The oscillation about the polar axis is most sensitive to γ and the 2-dimensional direction of the pole, including the 1.5427° tilt, is most sensitive to β. Consequently, accurate measurements of the physical librations provide accurate determinations of β =  and γ = .

The placement of 3 retroreflectors on the Moon by the Lunar Laser Ranging experiment and 2 retroreflectors by Lunokhod rovers allowed accurate measurement of the physical librations by laser ranging to the Moon.

Free physical libration 
A free physical libration is similar to the solution of the reduced equation for linear differential equations. The periods of the free librations can be calculated, but their amplitudes must be measured. Lunar Laser Ranging provides the determinations. The two largest free librations were discovered by O. Calame. Modern values are: 
 1.3 seconds of arc with a 1056 day (2.9 year) period for rotation about the polar axis, 
 a 74.6 year elliptical wobble of the pole of size 8.18 × 3.31 arcseconds, and 
 an 81 year rotation of the pole in space that is 0.03 seconds of arc in size. 

The fluid core can cause a fourth mode with a period around 4 centuries. The free librations are expected to damp out in times very short compared to the age of the Moon. Consequently, their existence implies that there must be one or more stimulating mechanisms.

See also
 Parallactic angle

References

External links 
 Libration of the Moon from educational website From Stargazers to Starships
 Astronomy Picture of the Day: 2005 November 13 – time-lapse animation of the Moon through one complete cycle, hosted by NASA
 Libration: 2 years in 2 seconds – 24 full moon pictures taken over two years, compiled in an animation (linked on page) showing the Moon's libration and variations in apparent diameter
 Observing the Lunar Libration Zones

Dynamics of the Solar System
Orbit of the Moon
Articles containing video clips